James Atherton (May 6, 1819 – March 4, 1879) was a 19th century Massachusetts businessman, a boot and shoe manufacturer, and a leather merchant.

Early life
He was born on May 6, 1819. The son of Samuel Atherton (17841877)  and Abigail Pope (17861868).  His father was a farmer and a prominent citizen of Stoughton, Massachusetts.

Atherton is a direct descendant of Major General Humphrey Atherton.

Career
Atherton established J&W Atherton, a boot and shoe manufacturer in Boston, in partnership with his younger brother William Atherton (18211891). In 1852 he entered into a partnership with his older brother Samuel Atherton and Caleb Stetson
At the time,  “Atherton, Stetson and Company”, dealers in leather, were one of Boston's most successful business. His brother, William, also entered into this partnership. Atherton suffered poor health most of his life and he retired from the business in 1867.

Personal
He married Phebe Reed (1831–1868) and had 3 children who died at the age of 37 when her youngest son, Walter was just five years old. He then married Mary Marshall (1841–1880), just a year later.

His sons, James and William  were both successful businessmen, involved in banking. His youngest son was the Boston architect, Walter Atherton.

He was uncle to the celebrated US Composer, Percy Lee Atherton and Massachusetts politician and philanthropist, Frederick Atherton.

He died on March 4, 1879, and was buried at Evergreen Cemetery, Stoughton, Massachusetts.

Biography

References

1819 births
1879 deaths
People from Stoughton, Massachusetts
Businesspeople from Massachusetts
19th-century American businesspeople